Kevin Murphy (April 9, 1937 – March 5, 2012) was appointed as Irish Ombudsman by the President of Ireland, Mary Robinson, upon nomination by both Houses of the Oireachtas.  His term of office began November 1, 1994 and ended in 2003.

Career
He was educated at Synge Street CBS before joining the civil service in 1955.

Murphy served in the Department of Industry and Commerce, in the Department of Finance, and joined the newly created Department of the Public Service in 1973. He became Secretary-General of the latter in 1983. In 1987, he was appointed Secretary-General, Public Service Management and Development at the Department of Finance. He was appointed Ombudsman in November 1994. where he dealt with complaints against government departments, local authorities, and other public bodies. Under the terms of the Freedom of Information Act, 1997, he also held the newly created office of Information Commissioner from April 1998. The Information Commissioner may review decisions of public bodies in relation to requests for access to information.

In June 2003, Emily O'Reilly succeeded him in both posts. Although Murphy retired from employment in 2002 when he turned 65, he has continued to serve Ireland in public life, including sitting on a committee to appoint members of the new Irish Press commission in 2006.

Personal life
Murphy was educated at Synge Street CBS.

He was married with four children and died 6 March 2012, aged 75.

References

Ombudsmen in the Republic of Ireland
2012 deaths
1937 births
People educated at Synge Street CBS